Tellinella is a genus of marine bivalve molluscs, in the subfamily Tellininae of the family Tellinidae.

Species
 † Tellinella acutangula (Deshayes, 1857) 
 † Tellinella biangularis (Deshayes, 1825) 
 † Tellinella canaliculata (Edwards, 1847) 
 Tellinella cruciata (Spengler, 1798)
 Tellinella crucigera (Lamarck, 1818)
 Tellinella cumingii (Hanley, 1844)
 Tellinella dissimilis (Deshayes, 1855)
 Tellinella listeri (Röding, 1798)
 Tellinella mexicana (Petit de la Saussaye, 1841)
 † Tellinella oblonga (G. B. Sowerby I, 1846) 
 Tellinella philippii (Philippi, 1844)
 † Tellinella pseudorostralis (d'Orbigny, 1850) 
 Tellinella regina (A. E. Salisbury, 1934)
 † Tellinella rostralina (Deshayes, 1825) 
 † Tellinella rostralis (Lamarck, 1806) 
 Tellinella severnsi M. Huber, Langleit & Kreipl, 2015
 Tellinella tithonia (A. A. Gould, 1850)
 Tellinella travancorica (E. A. Smith, 1899)
 Tellinella virgata (Linnaeus, 1758)
 Tellinella zacae (Hertlein & A. M. Strong, 1949)
Synonyms
 Tellinella adamsi [sic]: synonym of Pristipagia adamsii (Bertin, 1878) (misspelling)
 Tellinella albinella (Lamarck, 1818): synonym of Tellinota albinella (Lamarck, 1818)
 Tellinella asperrima (Hanley, 1844): synonym of Scutarcopagia pulcherrima (G. B. Sowerby I, 1825)
 Tellinella divergens (Anton, 1838): synonym of Tellinella crucigera (Lamarck, 1818)
 Tellinella exculta (Gould, 1851): synonym of Tellinella crucigera (Lamarck, 1818)
 † Tellinella ferrari Marwick, 1931: synonym of † Serratina ferrari (Marwick, 1931)  (original combination)
 Tellinella idae (Dall, 1891): synonym of Idatellina idae (Dall, 1891)
 Tellinella incerta (Deshayes, 1855): synonym of Tellinella cruciata (Spengler, 1798)
 Tellinella patagiata (Prashad, 1932): synonym of Afsharius patagiatus (Prashad, 1932)
 Tellinella pulcherrima (G. B. Sowerby I, 1825): synonym of Scutarcopagia pulcherrima (G. B. Sowerby I, 1825)
 Tellinella radians (Deshayes, 1855): synonym of Pristipagia radians (Deshayes, 1855)
 Tellinella rastella [sic]: synonym of Tellinella rastellum (Hanley, 1844): synonym of Tellinella philippii (Philippi, 1844) (misspelling)
 Tellinella rastellum (Hanley, 1844): synonym of Tellinella philippii (Philippi, 1844)
 Tellinella spengleri (Gmelin, 1791): synonym of Dallitellina rostrata (Linnaeus, 1758)
 Tellinella staurella (Lamarck, 1818): synonym of Tellinella cruciata (Spengler, 1798)
 Tellinella verrucosa (Hanley, 1844): synonym of Scutarcopagia verrucosa (Hanley, 1844)

References

External links
 

Tellinidae
Bivalve genera